The 1993 New York City Marathon was the 24th running of the annual marathon race in New York City, United States, which took place on Sunday, November 14. The men's elite race was won by Mexico's Andrés Espinosa in a time of 2:10:04 hours while the women's race was won by Germany's Uta Pippig in 2:26:24.

A total of 26,597 runners finished the race, 20,781 men and 5816 women.

Results

Men

Women

References

Results
Results. Association of Road Racing Statisticians. Retrieved 2020-05-23.

External links
New York Road Runners website

1993
New York City
Marathon
New York City Marathon